The Alice B Readers Award is given annually to living writers of lesbian fiction whose careers are distinguished by consistently well-written stories about lesbians. Named for Alice B. Toklas, the award is given once, only, in appreciation of career achievement. In addition to the medal, each recipient is given a lapel pin and a significant honorarium.

The Award was founded by Roberta "Sandy" Sandburg, who died of cancer at the age of 72 on June 16, 2009. Sandburg envisioned the Alice B Awards a decade or so ago, and in 2004 decided to make the awards a reality by committing funds from "an anonymous donor". A lifelong reader who was passionate about lesbian fiction, Sandburg wanted to thank and reward the authors who had given her so much joy, and she did so by establishing the Alice B fund and gathering a group of women who became the Alice B Readers Appreciation Committee.

In addition to Alice B Medals, until 2016 the Committee awarded Alice B Lavender Certificates to up-and-coming authors who do not yet have a body of work but who have published a remarkable work or two deserving of notice. Winners of the certificate received an honorarium of $50. After 2016, the Lavender Certificate was suspended. Due to the overwhelming number of debut writers, the Committee was no longer able to read so many debut books. 

By 2021, the Committee acknowledged that so many lesbian books were being published each year that they could no longer keep up and came to believe they were missing writers of great merit. In 2021, the Committee began inviting readers, publishers, and authors to submit any book that they believe is a "Best Work of Fiction" by an author and representative of the author being named as deserving of a medal for lifetime achievement.

Significance of the award 
Historically, lesbians have rarely had their voices heard in the fiction or nonfiction of modern society, (except perhaps as footnotes in medical journals regarding pathology). As Bertha Harris, author of many novels including Lover, once wrote: "Between the time of Sappho and the birth of Natalie Clifford Barney lies a 'lesbian silence' of twenty-four centuries." It was not until the 1970s and the establishment of Naiad Press (after the Stonewall riots in 1969), that books by, for, and about lesbians began to be regularly published. Still, it was a long hard road with little recognition and to this day, considerable difficulties and discrimination face authors of lesbian works.

The Alice B Award is one small contribution toward overcoming discrimination. As Martha Nell Smith wrote: The trajectory of lesbian literature for the first two-thirds of the twentieth century can be described as a movement from encrypted strategies for expressions of the love that dare not speak its name to overtly political celebrations of woman-for-woman passion that, by the late 1960s, refused to be denied, denigrated, or expunged.

The Alice B Award exists to honor and recognize forerunners of modern lesbian fiction including Ann Bannon, Jane Rule, Marijane Meaker, Sandra Scoppettone, Katherine V. Forrest, and Lee Lynch, as well as to the new voices who are providing information, entertainment, and enlightenment to lesbians around the world.

The Alice B Awards Committee 

The Alice B Awards Committee is an anonymous group of avid lesbian readers located around the US. The award is made possible by an anonymous donor. The donor and committee share a common goal: to reward and thank writers of lesbian fiction for their contribution to lesbian community, culture, and identity.

At least two Medals are given out annually. Selections are made from lists compiled by the committee members’ to include their all-time favorite living authors currently publishing and also those with a substantial body of excellent work, even if they are not now publishing.

Winners of the Alice B Award

2023
 Georgia Beers
 Abigail Padgett
 Lee Winter

2022
 Jessie Chandler
 Camarin Grae
 Cheryl A. Head
 Anne Laughlin

2021
 Jae (author)
 Malinda Lo
 Caren J. Werlinger

2020
 Lynn Ames
 Penny Mickelbury
 Jeanette Winterson

2019
 Dorothy Allison
 S. Renée Bess
 Fletcher DeLancey
 Mary Wings

2018
 Penny Hayes
 Barbara Johnson
 Rachel Spangler

2017
 Melissa Brayden
 Jaye Maiman
 Ann McMan

2016
 Justine Saracen
 Carsen Taite
 Pat Welch

2015
 Carol Anshaw
 Randye Lordon
 D Jordan Redhawk

2014
 Marianne K. Martin
 Susan X. Meagher
 Ann Roberts

2013
 Robin Alexander
 Sandra Scoppettone
 Linda K. Silva

2012
 Saxon Bennett
 KG MacGregor
 Gill McKnight

2011
 Erin Dutton
 Fran Heckrotte
 Ali Vali

2010
 Catherine Friend
 JM Redmann (also known as Jean M. Redmann)
 Kate Sweeney

2009
 Gun Brooke
 Jane Fletcher
 Nicola Griffith
 Lesléa Newman

2008
 Ann Bannon
 Kim Baldwin
 Cate Culpepper
 Lauren Wright Douglas
 Jennifer L. Jordan
 Val McDermid
 Joanna Russ
 Therese Szymanski

2007
 Alison Bechdel
 Gerri Hill
 Lori L. Lake
 Lee Lynch
 Marijane Meaker
 Jane Rule

2006
 Jennifer Fulton
 Claire McNab
 Ann Allen Shockley
 Sheila Ortiz-Taylor

2005
 Sarah Dreher
 Katherine V. Forrest
 Ellen Hart

2004
 Peggy J. Herring
 Karin Kallmaker
 Radclyffe

Winners of the Lavender Certificate

2005
 Jaime Clevenger for The Unknown Mile
 Gabrielle Goldsby for The Caretaker's Daughter
 C. Paradee for Deep Cover

2006
 Cynthia Tyler for Descanso

2007
 Brenda Adcock for Pipeline

2008
 L-J Baker for Broken Wings
 Catherine Friend for The Spanish Pearl
 Nairne Holtz for The Skin Beneath

2009
 Del Robertson for Taming the Wolff
 Gill McKnight for Falling Star and Green-eyed Monster

2010
 DL Line for On Dangerous Ground
 Colette Moody for The Sublime and Spirited Voyage of Original Sin
 Carsen Taite for truelesbianlove.com

2011
 Amy Briant for Shadow Point 
 Nat Burns for Two Weeks in August
 Gina Noelle Daggett for Jukebox
 D. Jackson Leigh for Bareback and Long Shot
 Kristin Marra for Wind and Bones
 Amy Dawson Robertson for Miles to Go

2012
 Regina Hanel for Love Another Day 
 Cari Hunter for Snowbound
 Ann McMan for Jericho
 AJ Quinn for Hostage Moon
 Pol Robinson for Open Water

2013
 Andrea Bramhall for Ladyfish
 Maggie Morton for Dreaming of Her
 Jenna Rae for The Writing on the Wall
 Robin Silverman for Lemon Reef
 Rebecca Swartz for Everything Pales in Comparison

2014 
 Miriam Ruth Black for Turtle Season
 Lea Daley for Waiting for Harper Lee
 M E Logan for Lexington Connection
 Diane Wood for Web of Obsessions

2015 
 Marie Castle for Hell's Belle
 Jaime Maddox for Agnes

2016 
 Jean Copeland for The Revelation of Beatrice Darby
 Jenny Frame for A Royal Romance
 Sophia French for The Diplomat
 Brandy T. Wilson for The Palace Blues

References

Notes 

1. The Lesbian History Portal. Retrieved on 2008-05-31. 
2. Bertha Harris on glbtq.com Retrieved on 2008-05-31. 
3. American Literature: Lesbian, 1900-1969. Martha Nell Smith. Retrieved on 2008-05-31. 
4. The Alice B Medal Current Winners Biographical page. Retrieved on 2014-02-14.

5. The Alice B Medal Past Winners Page. Retrieved on 2014-02-14.

External links 
 Alice B Awards
 Bella Books which assumed the mantle from Naiad Books.
 GLBTQ.com Literary Section
 About the founder of the award
 Alice B Awards Facebook Page established 2021.

American literary awards
Awards established in 2005
2005 establishments in the United States
LGBT literature in the United States
LGBT literary awards